.cda is a common filename extension denoting a small (44 byte) stub file generated by Microsoft Windows for each audio track on a standard "Red Book" CD-DA format audio CD as defined by the Table of Contents (ToC) (within the lead-in's subcode). These files are shown in the directory for the CD being viewed in the format Track##.cda, where ## is the number of each individual track.

The .cda files do not contain the actual PCM sound wave data, but instead tell where on the disc each track starts and stops. If the file is "copied" from the CD to a computer, it cannot be used on its own because it is only a shortcut to part of the disc. However, some audio editing and CD creation programs will, from the user's perspective, load .cda files as though they are actual audio data files, and allow the user to listen to them.

Organization of a CDA file

The size of a CDA file being fixed, as well as its organization, there is always only one and only chunk, named "CDDA" (meaning Compact Disc for Digital Audio).

The identifier created by Windows is used by the Windows 95 and Windows 98 CD drive (cdplayer.exe). This player cannot connect to FreeDB or CDDB. So that it can display the artist name and song title, you have to manually enter this information in the cdplayer.ini file (in the Windows installation directory), in a section named after that identifier. This identifier has no relation to the DiscId used by FreeDB or CDDB, it is a purely Microsoft creation, for the above use.

The position and length of the tracks use frames as the unit. There are 75 frames per second. This is the smallest block of data that can be read from an audio CD, corresponding to a sector of the CD.

All the information which requires several bytes is coded with the order-byte Intel (Little-endian).

Software that uses .cda format
Windows Media Player
Media Player Classic
KMPlayer
AIMP Player
Winamp Player
GOM Player
Foobar2000
XMPlay
Zune for Windows
iTunes
MusicMatch Jukebox

See also
Audio file format

References

External links
File format 

Computer file formats
Compact disc